Damian Czykier (pronounced ; born 10 August 1992) is a Polish athlete specialising in the high hurdles. He came fourth at the 2015 Summer Universiade and the 2016 European Championships.

His personal bests are 13.28 seconds in the 110 metres hurdles (+1.2 m/s, Bydgoszcz 2017) and 7.65 seconds in the 60 metres hurdles (Belgrade 2017). Both of his parents are former athletes; father Dariusz Czykier was a footballer while mother Elżbieta Stankiewicz a basketball player.

Competition record

References

1992 births
Living people
Polish male hurdlers
Athletes (track and field) at the 2016 Summer Olympics
Olympic athletes of Poland
Sportspeople from Białystok
World Athletics Championships athletes for Poland
Universiade medalists in athletics (track and field)
Podlasie Białystok athletes
Universiade bronze medalists for Poland
Polish Athletics Championships winners
Competitors at the 2015 Summer Universiade
Medalists at the 2017 Summer Universiade
Athletes (track and field) at the 2020 Summer Olympics
21st-century Polish people